Reynald Seznec (born May 11, 1953 in Laval, Mayenne, France) is a French engineer and businessman. He was the President and CEO of the Franco-Italian company Thales Alenia Space from 2008 to 2012, succeeding to Pascale Sourisse in the Cannes Mandelieu Space Center.

References

External links
 Thales Alenia Space Official Website

1953 births
École Polytechnique alumni
French chief executives
French aerospace engineers
Living people
French engineers